Sha Wan may refer to:
Émmanuel-Édouard Chavannes, a French sinologist
Sandy Bay, a bay in Hong Kong